Thomas Lynch (born 10 October 1964 in Limerick) is an Irish former footballer who played as a defender.
He made his football league debut playing for Sunderland but after just four starts he was signed by Asa Hartford for Shrewsbury Town.

Style of play
Lynch has clocked over 200 appearances with his no-nonsense defending, akin to that of Stuart Pearce. Lynch was at Shrewsbury during a period of transition, and while overall club performances at times lacked, Lynch never did, making him a real crowd pleaser.

A moment which really personified Lynch's style of play can be found in the 1991/92 season; after a strong tackle, a Stoke City player who took exception to his challenge, proceeded to retaliate and headbutt Lynch. Lynch shook his head to clear it, in time to see the aforementioned player being red carded and simultaneously carried off on a stretcher, and later being diagnosed with a fractured skull.

Lynch now lives back home in Ireland. He works for the Department of Children and Youth Affairs, as a co-ordinator of a school completion programme, working closely alongside children and their families.

In August 2011, Lynch was inducted into the Shrewsbury Town players hall of fame, among the likes of Arthur Rowley, Graham Turner, Alf Wood and goalkeeper Ken Mulhearn.

In October 2016, Lynch was voted onto Town's greatest ever XI. As one of ten nominated left backs, he received 54% of the fans' vote. Along with the other 10 players who were voted onto the greatest XI, Lynch is depicted in graffiti form in The Salop Leisure Stand Concourse at The New Meadow.

External links
 http://www.shrewsburytown.com/news/article/legends-tommy-lynch-209809.aspx

1964 births
Living people
Sportspeople from Limerick (city)
Association football defenders
Republic of Ireland association footballers
League of Ireland players
League of Ireland managers
Limerick F.C. players
Sunderland A.F.C. players
Shrewsbury Town F.C. players
Waterford F.C. players
Waterford F.C. managers
League of Ireland XI players
Association footballers from County Limerick
Republic of Ireland football managers